Charles Pictet de Rochemont (21 September 1755 – 28 December 1824) was a statesman and diplomat who prepared the declaration of Switzerland's permanent neutrality ratified by the great powers in 1815.

Early life

Charles Pictet was born on 21 September 1755 at Cartigny near Geneva into an aristocratic but tolerant family. He is the son of a colonel, Charles Pictet (1713–1792) and of Marie, born Dunant. From a young age, he wanted to dedicate himself to a military career. At the age of 20 he went to France and for twelve years pursued a career in the French Army. After his marriage in 1786 to Adélaïde Sara de Rochemont he modified his name to the more aristocratic "Pictet de Rochemont". Two years later he entered the governing council of Geneva and was made responsible for reorganizing the urban militia.

In 1792 the former city councils of Geneva were suspended and a provisional government took over, declaring all citizens equal. In 1794 Pictet was placed under house arrest for a year. His father-in-law, Jean-François de Rochemont, was less lucky; he was executed.

Napoleonic Wars

Later, Switzerland became a theatre of war. Napoleon had invaded in 1798 and everywhere egalitarian ideas took root and the old aristocracy was swept away. Armies devastated the countryside and the winter of 1800 would long be remembered as one of misery and starvation. Geneva was annexed to France. A few weeks later Napoleon issued a new constitution for a Helvetic Republic trying to replace the former archaic system of cantonal authorities with a centralized executive. This caused such a violent reaction that Napoleon withdrew his troops in 1802.

The power vacuum thus created set off a civil war, during which Napoleon offered his services as arbitrator. He urged the Swiss to come up with a constitution themselves. The new constitution restored the notion of autonomous cantons, created six new cantons and gave a new name to the country — the Swiss Confederation. Meanwhile, in 1798, Pictet de Rochemont had acquired seventy-five hectares of land at Lancy, centred on the present mairie de Lancy, and led the life of a gentleman farmer. He concentrated on the breeding of merino sheep and introduced the culture of maize to the Geneva region. His agrarian innovations spread. Alongside his life as a farmer, he wrote a great deal and founded a review entitled La bibliothèque britannique. From 1796 to 1815 he wrote the agricultural column in it.

Napoleon's downfall led to the liberation of Geneva by Austrian troops. A new republican government was declared on 1 January 1814 and Pictet read the public proclamation, probably written by himself. Napoleon's brief return to power in 1815 — the Hundred Days — ending at the Battle of Waterloo does not seem to have had any effect on the events that followed.

Diplomat

Two apparently contradictory objectives of the new government, much favoured by Pictet, were to restore Genevan independence but also to make Geneva part of the Swiss Confederation. To achieve this it was necessary to: 
(a) to make Genevan territory homogeneous (it consisted of several fragmented communes); and 
(b) to connect it physically to the canton of Vaud and thus to Switzerland as a whole (Versoix was in France). Pictet participated in the first deputation sent in 1814 to request that the Great Powers support Geneva's position. He then represented Geneva and Switzerland in several rounds of meetings held in Paris (Treaty of Paris) and Vienna (Congress of Vienna) during 1814 and 1815. While the victors were mainly interested in sharing the spoils of war, Pictet de Rochement's political talent and diplomatic skills were aimed precisely at recovering Geneva's independence and joining it to the twenty-one cantons then forming the Swiss Confederation, Valais and Neuchâtel having just entered as full and equal cantons.

The first confrontation in Paris was not a success since the French negotiator, Talleyrand, refused to let go of any part of the Pays de Gex. Later, in October 1814 there was the Congress of Vienna. Pictet participated actively in the relevant conclaves and negotiations, not waiting for suitable outcomes to come his way. The idea that Geneva should form part of the Swiss Confederation became a reality on 19 May 1815.

However, Geneva had not yet been able to consolidate its fragmented territory. But now, following the change in Geneva's status, Pictet could count on the backing of the Swiss Government and was given full powers to negotiate. He soon achieved the territorial success he sought.

North of the lake, six communes were transferred from the pays de Gex, thus giving Geneva its connection with the canton of Vaud. As had already been decided in Vienna and Paris, by the Treaty of Turin in 1816 on the left bank another twenty-three communes were transferred from Savoy and became part of the canton. King Victor Emmanuel I of Sardinia had himself only just recently recovered this territory. This extension of the cantonal land became known as the "communes réunies", hence the road of this name in Grand-Lancy. It was also stated that the non-Swiss customs posts were to be situated at least one league (approximately five kilometres) from the new Swiss frontier, thus creating the "zone franche" on both sides of the canton. Into the bargain, the Great Powers meeting in Paris recognized the "permanent neutrality of Switzerland" and agreed that Swiss neutrality was, indeed, in the common interest of all European countries. Pictet himself wrote the text of the declaration of neutrality.

Later life and posterity

In the summer of 1816 Pictet de Rochemont returned to his sheep and his maize fields having perfectly succeeded in his mission. The Swiss parliament or Diet (Tagsatzung), as it was at that time, expressed its recognition of his services.

He died on 28 December 1824 at Lancy.

A statue of Charles Pictet de Rochemont has been erected Rampe de la Treille at the entrance of the Old Town in 1970.

See also 
 Bourgeois of Geneva 
 Pictet Group

References
 Diva International

External links
  Pictet Family Archives
 

1755 births
1824 deaths
18th-century politicians from the Republic of Geneva
Swiss diplomats
Swiss Protestants
R